Marek Gengel (born 17 September 1995) is a Czech tennis player.

Gengel has a career high ATP singles ranking of 256 achieved on 16 January 2023. He also has a career high doubles ranking of 151 achieved on 12 September 2022.

Gengel has won 1 ATP Challenger doubles title at the 2023 Nonthaburi Challenger with Adam Pavlásek.

Tour titles

Doubles

References

External links
 
 

1995 births
Living people
Czech male tennis players
People from Rakovník